Earl Spencer Pomeroy (1915–2005) was an American historian whose work focused on the Western United States.

Pomeroy was born in Capitola, California. He received his B.A. from San Jose State College in 1936, and subsequently attended the University of California, Berkeley for graduate work, where he received his Ph.D. in 1940 under the direction of Frederic L. Paxson.

From 1942 to 1945, Pomeroy taught at the University of North Carolina, Chapel Hill. In 1945, he moved to Ohio State University, where he remained until 1949. In that year, he accepted a position at the University of Oregon, where he remained until 1976.  He served as the Beekman Professor of History at Oregon.  He served on the Department of the Army Historical Advisory Committee.  In his time at Oregon, he oversaw 20 doctoral dissertations. One of his notable doctoral students was Peter Simpson.

In 1976 he accepted an appointment at the University of California, San Diego, where he remained until his retirement in 1986.

Awards and Prizes
1942 Beveridge Prize from the American Historian Association (awarded to fund publication of The Territories and the United States)
1956 Guggenheim Fellowship for U.S. History
1971 President, Pacific Coast Branch, American Historical Association
1993 President, Western Historical Association

Bibliography
The Territories and the United States, 1861–1890: Studies in Colonial Administration (1947)
Pacific Outpost: Guam and Micronesia in American Strategy (1951)
"Toward a Reorientation of Western History: Continuity and Environment," in the Mississippi Valley Historical Review 41 (March 1955)
In Search of the Golden West: The Tourist in Western America (1957)
"The Changing West," in John Higham, ed., The Reconstruction of American History (1962)

References

20th-century American historians
20th-century American male writers
University of North Carolina at Chapel Hill faculty
Ohio State University faculty
University of Oregon faculty
University of California, San Diego faculty
San Jose State University alumni
University of California, Berkeley alumni
People from Capitola, California
1915 births
2005 deaths
Historians from California
American male non-fiction writers